Gabriel Omar Batistuta (born 1 February 1969) is an Argentine former professional footballer. During his playing career, Batistuta was nicknamed Batigol as well as El Ángel Gabriel (Spanish for Angel Gabriel). Regarded as one of the greatest strikers of all time, noted in particular for powerful strikes from volleys or from distance while on the run, in 1999, Batistuta placed third for the FIFA World Player of the Year award. In 2004, he was named by Pelé in the FIFA 100 list of the world's greatest living players.

After beginning his career in Argentina in 1988 with Newell's Old Boys, followed by River Plate and Boca Juniors where he won titles, the prolific striker played most of his club football with Serie A club Fiorentina in Italy; he is their all-time top scorer in Serie A with 151 goals. When Fiorentina was relegated to Serie B in 1993, Batistuta stayed with the club and helped them return to the top-flight league a year later. He became an icon in Florence; the Fiorentina fans erected a life-size bronze statue of him in 1996, in recognition of his performances for the club. Despite winning the Coppa Italia and the Supercoppa Italiana with the club in 1996, he never won the Serie A title with Fiorentina, but when he moved to Roma in 2000 for €36 million – the highest fee ever paid for a player over the age of 30 until Cristiano Ronaldo moved from Real Madrid to Juventus in 2018 – he won the 2000–01 Serie A title. After a brief loan spell with Inter Milan in 2003, he played his last two seasons in Qatar with Al-Arabi before he retired in 2005.

At international level, Batistuta was Argentina's all-time leading goalscorer with 56 goals in 78 official matches, a record he held until 21 June 2016, when he was surpassed by Lionel Messi. He participated in three FIFA World Cups, scoring 10 goals, making him Argentina's second top scorer in the competition after Messi, and the joint tenth-highest World Cup goalscorer of all time. Batistuta is the only player in football history to score two hat-tricks in different World Cups. With the Argentina national team he won two consecutive Copa América titles (1991 and 1993), the 1993 CONMEBOL–UEFA Cup of Champions, and the 1992 FIFA Confederations Cup.

Early and personal life 
Batistuta was born on 1 February 1969 to slaughterhouse worker Omar Batistuta and school secretary Gloria Zilli, in the town of Avellaneda, but grew up in the nearby city of Reconquista. He has three older sisters, Elisa, Alejandra, and Gabriela. Batistuta is a Roman Catholic. At the age of 16, he met Irina Fernández, his future wife, at her quinceañera, a rite of passage on her 15th birthday. On 28 December 1990, they were married at Saint Roque Church.

The couple moved to Florence, Italy, in 1991, and a year later their first son, Thiago, was born. Thanks to good performances in the Italian championship and with the Argentina national team, Batistuta gained fame and respect. He filmed several commercials and was invited onto numerous TV shows, but in spite of this, Batistuta always remained a low-profile family man. In 1997, Batistuta's second son, Lucas, was born, and a third son, Joaquín, followed in 1999. He now has a fourth son Shamel. In 2000, Batistuta and his family moved to Rome, where he played for Roma. Two years after Shamel was born, Batistuta was loaned to Inter. In 2003, after 12 years in Italy, the family moved to Qatar where Batistuta had accepted a lucrative celebrity playing contract with a local team, Al-Arabi, ending his career there in 2005. He moved back to Argentina in 2007.

Despite having completed his coaching badges in Argentina, he currently has no involvement with football, instead (primarily as he has difficulty walking) he prefers to play polo and golf, he was quoted saying 'I don't like football, it's only my job'. In later interviews with FIFA he expanded, “I lived and breathed football”, adding, “when I was playing football I never enjoyed it that much, I was never happy ... if I scored two goals, I wanted a third, I always wanted more. Now it's all over I can look back with satisfaction, but I never felt that way when I was playing.” In 2006 he expressed an interest in coaching Australia's national team and Argentina's team. During the 2006 FIFA World Cup he worked as a commentator for Televisa Deportes. Batistuta currently runs his own construction company in Argentina. He also worked as technical secretary in the professional football club Colón, joining the club's staff in January 2012, and leaving at the end of the 2012–13 season.

Speaking in a television interview in Argentina in 2014, Batistuta said the pain suffered in his ankles after retiring in 2005 became so intense that he "urinated in bed with the toilet only a few steps away. I couldn't move." He visited a doctor he knew asking his legs be amputated, but the doctor turned down his request. Although he later underwent surgery to relieve the pressure on his cartilage and tendons, and his condition improved slightly, in a 2017 interview he stated that he still had difficulty walking and faced mobility issues as a result of the stresses and injuries he faced throughout his football career due to overexerting himself. He has however still been able to take part in charity football games, and in 2014 he scored twice – one a trademark finish with a powerful 35 yard strike into the roof of the net – in a game in Italy.

Batistuta currently lives in Perth, Western Australia, Australia.

Club career

Early career 

As a child, Batistuta preferred other sports to football. Because of his height he played basketball, but after Argentina's victory in the 1978 FIFA World Cup, in which he was particularly impressed by the skills of Mario Kempes, he devoted himself to football. After playing with friends on the streets and in the small Grupo Alegria club, Batistuta joined the local Platense junior team. While with Platense he was selected for the Reconquista team that won the provincial championship following victory over Newell's Old Boys. Batistuta's two goals drew the attention of the opposition team’s coach Marcelo Bielsa, and he signed a professional contract with Newell’s in 1988.

Newell's Old Boys 
At Newell's Old Boys under Bielsa, who would later become Batistuta's national coach with the Argentina national team, things did not come easily for him during his first year with the club. He was away from home, his family, and his girlfriend Irina, sleeping in a room at the stadium, and had a weight problem that slowed his progress. At the end of that year, Batistuta was loaned to a smaller team, Deportivo Italiano, with whom he participated in the Carnevale Cup in Italy, ending as top scorer with three goals. Under the guidance of Bielsa, whom Batistuta described in his autobiography as the most important coach he has ever had, and “the one who taught me how to train on rainy days, he taught me everything”, he was physically transformed, fed encouragement, and was set on the path into the player he was to become.

River Plate 
In mid-1989, Batistuta made the leap to one of Argentina's biggest clubs, River Plate, where he scored 17 goals and River Plate won Argentine Primera División 1990. However, he was drawn out of the team by the new manager Daniel Passarella in the mid-season, apparently with no specific reason. According to Batistuta, they never had a dispute. Passarella declared at that time "when Batistuta finds a team that be able to play to him he will be lethal" and highlighted his professionalism.

Boca Juniors 

In 1990, Batistuta joined River Plate's arch rivals, Boca Juniors. He initially found it hard to find his best form, in part not playing in his position. However, at the beginning of 1991, Óscar Tabárez became Boca Juniors' new manager and he gave Batistuta the support and put him into his best place in the field, the centre of attack, rather than as an outside forward. Batistuta finished the season as the league's top scorer as Boca Juniors won the championship.

Fiorentina 
While playing for Argentina in the 1991 Copa América, the vice-president of Fiorentina was impressed by Batistuta's skills and signed him. He had a fine start in Serie A, scoring 13 goals in his debut season. However, the following season, in 1992–93, Fiorentina lost in the relegation battle and were demoted to Serie B, despite Batistuta's 16 league goals. The club returned to Serie A after one season in Serie B, with the contribution of 16 goals from Batistuta and the management of Claudio Ranieri, as Fiorentina captured the 1993–94 Serie B title.

At Fiorentina, Batistuta found his best form. He was the top scorer of the 1994–95 Serie A season with 26 goals, and he broke Ezio Pascutti's 32-year-old record by scoring in all of the first 11 matches of the season. In the 1995–96 season, Batistuta, alongside Rui Costa and Francesco Baiano, helped the club to go on a 15-match unbeaten run, as they eventually ended the season with a fourth-place league finish. Fiorentina also won the Coppa Italia and Supercoppa Italiana over A.C. Milan; in the two-legged Coppa Italia final against Atalanta, Batistuta scored a goal in each fixture as Fiorentina won 3–0 on aggregate. The next season was less successful, as Fiorentina finished in a disappointing ninth place in the league, although the team managed to reach the semi-finals of the 1996–97 UEFA Cup Winners' Cup, losing out to eventual champions Barcelona, despite scoring a goal in a 1–1 away draw in the first leg. Scoring over 20 league goals in each of the next three seasons – made all the more impressive given Serie A was the strongest league in the world and the hardest to score in with the best defences – as well as spectacular powerful strikes against Arsenal and Manchester United in the UEFA Champions League, Batistuta came third for FIFA World Player of the Year in 1999. Batistuta and Ronaldo were the two best strikers in Serie A, with their duels the most anticipated in Italy.

After his failure to win the Italian championship with Fiorentina, Batistuta started considering a transfer to a bigger team. In an effort to keep Batistuta, Fiorentina hired Giovanni Trapattoni as coach and promised to do everything to win the Scudetto. After an excellent start to the season, Batistuta suffered an injury that kept him out of action for more than a month. Losing momentum, Fiorentina lost the lead and finished the season in third place, although the result enabled them to participate in the Champions League the following season.

In addition to the fans erecting a life-size bronze statue of him in Florence, Batistuta was inducted into the club’s hall of fame in 2014. An emotional Batistuta told the audience at the ceremony: “From the moment I arrived at Fiorentina I wanted a place in the history of the club – and now I can say I have succeeded.”

Roma 

Batistuta stayed at Fiorentina for the 1999–2000 season, tempted by the chance of winning both the Scudetto and the Champions League. After a promising start in both competitions, the team only reached seventh in the league and were eliminated in the second round group phase of the European tournament. The following season, he was transferred to Roma in a deal worth 70 billion lire (€36.2 million) and signed a three-year contract, which earned 14.8 billion Italian lire (€7.6 million) per year before tax. The fee paid for Batistuta became the highest fee ever paid for a player over the age of 30. The record was broken in 2017 when Leonardo Bonucci was signed by A.C. Milan on a five-year contract for a €42 million fee.

During the 2000–01 season, Batistuta finally garnered a Serie A winners' medal, scoring 20 league goals, as Roma clinched the Scudetto for the first time since 1983, including a goal in the 3–1 title-deciding victory over Parma on 17 June 2001 at the Stadio Olimpico in Rome. On 26 November 2000 Batistuta scored an 83rd-minute winner with a right-foot volley from 30 yards in a league game against Fiorentina in Rome – visibly upset having done so he refused to celebrate with his Roma teammates. Before the match he ran over to the 3,000 Fiorentina fans and saluted them, and did the same at full time, receiving adoration in return, before he left the stadium in tears. Sean Ingle, match reporter for The Guardian, wrote, “Batistuta breaks Florentine hearts, and his own.” The following season with Roma, he changed his shirt number from 18 to 20 in reference to the number of goals he had scored during the Scudetto winning campaign. He also wore his age on the back of his Roma shirt in 2002, number 33.

Loan to Inter Milan 
Now aged 34, Batistuta failed to find form with Roma and was loaned out to Inter Milan, scoring two goals in twelve matches, although he did provide assists for Christian Vieri. Batistuta sought a move to England to play with Fulham, but the deal never transpired.

Al-Arabi 
He departed Italy for Qatar in 2003, joining Al-Arabi on a free transfer in a deal worth $8 million. Batistuta ended the season by netting 25 goals, thus surpassing the record for most goals scored, which was previously held by Qatari legend Mansour Muftah. Batistuta announced his retirement in 2005.

International career 

In 1991, Batistuta was selected to play for Argentina in the Copa América held in Chile, where he finished the tournament as top scorer with six goals as Argentina romped to victory. The following year, he won the FIFA Confederations Cup with Argentina, finishing as the tournament's top-scorer. In 1993, Batistuta played in his second Copa América, this time held in Ecuador, which Argentina won with Batistuta scoring both goals in a 2–1 win over Mexico in the final.

The 1994 World Cup, held in the United States, was a disappointment. After a promising start Argentina were beaten by Romania in the last 16. The morale of the team was seriously affected by Diego Maradona's doping suspension. Despite the disappointing Argentine exit, Batistuta scored four goals in as many games, including a hat-trick in their opening game against Greece.

During the qualification matches for the 1998 World Cup (with former River Plate manager Daniel Passarella) Batistuta was left out of the majority of the games after falling out with the coach over team rules. The two eventually put the dispute aside and Batistuta was recalled for the tournament. In the game against Jamaica, he recorded the second hat-trick of his World Cup career, becoming the fourth player to achieve this (the others were Sándor Kocsis, Just Fontaine, and Gerd Müller) and the first to score a hat-trick in two World Cups. Argentina were knocked out of the World Cup by the Netherlands courtesy of a last-minute Dennis Bergkamp winner after the two sides had been locked at 1–1 for more than 70 minutes.

After a good series of performances by Argentina in the qualification matches for the 2002 World Cup, hopes were high that the South Americans – now managed by Marcelo Bielsa – could win the trophy, and Batistuta announced that he planned to quit the national team at the end of the tournament, which Argentina aimed to win. But Argentina's "group of death" saw the team fall at the first hurdle, only managing a victory against Nigeria (Batistuta scored the match's only goal). They later fell to England 1–0 and managed a mere 1–1 tie against Sweden. This meant that the team was knocked out in the opening round for the first time since 1962. With 54 goals from 77 games, Batistuta was the record goalscorer for Argentina, a record he held until it was surpassed by Lionel Messi in 2016. Batistuta admitted he was a little annoyed at losing the record, stating, “You go around the world and people say, 'he's the top scorer for the Argentina national team’, before he then added, “But the advantage I have is that I'm second to an extraterrestrial."

Style of play 

A quick, hard-working, and powerful player, with an eye for goal and a good all-round game, Batistuta is considered one of the most complete, feared and prolific striker of his generation. As a striker, he was primarily known for his technique, offensive movement off the ball, strength in the air, and powerful, clinical finishing ability with both feet from anywhere on the pitch, despite being naturally right-footed.

Batistuta also possessed an excellent positional sense, as well as an ability to anticipate defenders in the area, score acrobatic goals from volleys or bicycle kicks, and strike the ball first time from tight angles while on the run. He was also highly regarded due to his accurate heading and powerful free-kick taking abilities; although he was a competent penalty taker, his conversion rate from the spot throughout his career was less reliable. In addition to his skill and goalscoring abilities, Batistuta frequently stood out on the pitch throughout his career due to his leadership and fair-play. Diego Maradona stated that Batistuta is the best striker he has ever seen play the game. Batistuta’s goal celebration – both arms upturned with his fists clenched – features in his statue placed next to those of Maradona and Messi in an emblematic square in the Recoleta district of Buenos Aires. Batistuta also often celebrated a goal by pretending he was firing a machine gun. Batistuta suffered several injuries throughout his career, which often limited his playing time and fitness, in particular in his later career, which would eventually force him to retire.

Filmography

Career statistics

Club

International

Honours 
River Plate
 Argentine Primera División: 1989–90

Boca Juniors
 Torneo Clausura: 1991

Fiorentina
 Serie B: 1993–94
 Coppa Italia: 1995–96
 Supercoppa Italiana: 1996

Roma
 Serie A: 2000–01
 Supercoppa Italiana: 2001

Argentina
 Copa América: 1991, 1993
 Kirin Cup: 1992
 FIFA Confederations Cup: 1992
 CONMEBOL–UEFA Cup of Champions: 1993

Individual
 Copa América Golden Boot: 1991, 1995
 FIFA Confederations Cup top scorer: 1992
 Serie A top scorer: 1994–95
 Coppa Italia Top Scorer: 1995–96
 FIFA XI: 1997, 1998
 FIFA World Cup Silver Shoe: 1998
 Argentine Player of the Year: 1998
 ESM Team of the Year: 1998–1999
 Serie A Foreign Footballer of the Year: 1999
 FIFA World Player of the Year: Bronze Award 1999
Ballon d'Or: 1998 (6th place), 1999 (4th place), 2000 (7th place)
 FIFA 100
 Qatari League top Scorer: 2003–04
 Italian Football Hall of Fame: 2013
 ACF Fiorentina Hall of Fame: 2014
 A.S. Roma Hall of Fame: 2015
 AFA Team of All Time (published 2015)
 Fiorentina All-time XI
 Fiorentina All-time top scorer in Serie A

See also 

List of men's footballers with 50 or more international goals

Notes

References

Further reading

External links 

  
 International statistics at rsssf
 
  Midfield Dynamo's 10 Heroes of the Copa América Batistuta listed in the top 10
 Gabriel Batistuta – Photo profile
  

1969 births
Living people
People from Reconquista, Santa Fe
Sportspeople from Santa Fe Province
Argentine people of Basque descent
Argentine people of Italian descent
Argentine Roman Catholics
Argentine footballers
Association football forwards
Newell's Old Boys footballers
Boca Juniors footballers
Club Atlético River Plate footballers
ACF Fiorentina players
A.S. Roma players
Inter Milan players
Al-Arabi SC (Qatar) players
Argentine Primera División players
Serie A players
Serie B players
Qatar Stars League players
Argentina international footballers
1991 Copa América players
1992 King Fahd Cup players
1993 Copa América players
1994 FIFA World Cup players
1995 King Fahd Cup players
1995 Copa América players
1998 FIFA World Cup players
2002 FIFA World Cup players
Copa América-winning players
FIFA Confederations Cup-winning players
FIFA 100
Argentine expatriate footballers
Argentine expatriate sportspeople in Italy
Argentine expatriate sportspeople in Qatar
Expatriate footballers in Italy
Expatriate footballers in Qatar
Argentine male actors